Nazi zombies are a horror trope found in films, video games, and comic books. Nazi zombie narratives usually feature undead Nazi soldiers resurrected to fight for the Third Reich. The book Nazisploitation!: The Nazi Image in Low-Brow Cinema and Culture described the  genre as a small theme of horror films. 

The first Nazi zombies films King of the Zombies and Revenge of the Zombies were produced during World War II. Nazisploitation began to appear concurrently in other film subgenres.  These include a mini-invasion of Nazi zombie films such as Shock Waves, Night of the Zombies, Zombie Lake and Oasis of the Zombies. The increased popularity of the zombie film in the 2000s increased interest in the Nazi zombie subgenre, with films such as Horrors of War, Dead Snow, and Frankenstein's Army.  More modern films such as Overlord, continue the Nazi zombie film genre.  Nazi Zombies also feature in the Wolfenstein series, Call of Duty series, and Sniper Elite series of video games.

Feature films

See also
 Exploitation films
 List of zombie short films and undead-related projects

References

Nazis in fiction
Zombies and revenants in popular culture